This is a list of the world's best-selling Latin albums of recorded music. "Latin music" has different meanings in the music industry. For example, the Latin music market in the United States defines Latin music as any release sung mostly in Spanish regardless of genre or artist nationality by organizations like the Recording Industry Association of America (RIAA) and Billboard, while international organizations and trade groups such as the Latin Recording Academy includes Portuguese-language music. As a musical genre, music journalists as well as musicologists defines Latin music as musical styles from Spanish-speaking areas of Latin America as well as Spain under the Latin music umbrella, while music from Brazil is also usually included and occasionally Portugal.

As a result of the conflicting views of defining Latin music, the list includes Latin albums defined either by language or genre. Therefore, for an album to appear on the list, the figure must have been published by a reliable source, the album must have sold at least 2 million copies with at least 500,000 certified units, and must either a) have at least 51% of its content in Spanish or Portuguese or b) is a Latin instrumental album (or any of its subgenres). Merely being of Latin heritage or having "Latin influence" for non Spanish- or Portuguese-language albums is not sufficient for inclusion in this list. For example, Laundry Service (2001) is not listed despite Shakira being Colombian, because music journalists have described it as not being a Latin album. Similarly, Marc Anthony has described his 1999 self-titled album as not a Latin album. This list can contain any types of album, including studio albums, extended plays, greatest hits, compilations, various artists, soundtracks and remixes. The figures given do not take into account the resale of used albums. For albums with multiple versions, only the Spanish/Portuguese version(s) will be counted towards the sales.

All albums included on this list have their available claimed figures in certified copies. Online certifications in Latin America are not extensive and only date back to a certain time period. For example, AMPROFON, the certifying authority in Mexico, only has certifications dating back to 1999 on its online database. Certifications from Latin American countries may be used if the source mentions the certifying authority of that country. In the case of sales of Latin albums in the US, primarily those released before the 1990s, certifications were awarded by the artists own record label rather than the RIAA with a lower threshold, a practice that was widely criticized by Latin label executives due to sales not being audited by an outside party. In addition, the RIAA noted that sales for many salsa albums went unreported because venues selling the discs did not report to monitoring services. In a 1989 article for Billboard, Carlos Agudelo  cited the insularity of the Latin music market in the US for the lack of reliable sales numbers reported to the RIAA. Therefore, only certifications listed on the RIAA database may be used for US certifications. Albums released before the 1990s are only expected to have their claimed figures.

As a result of the methodology that the American and Canadian certification-awarding bodies (the RIAA and Music Canada respectively) use, each disc in a multi-disc set is counted as one unit toward certification, leading to many double albums on the list being certified with a number double the number of copies sold there. Such albums have the certifications for the number of copies (not discs) shipped indicated. Conversely, the American certification level for double albums that fit onto one compact disc reflect the actual number of copies sold. In 2016, RIAA included streaming in addition to track sales and album sales based on the concept of album-equivalent unit for certification purposes, and certification therefore no longer reflects shipment alone.

Spanish singer Julio Iglesias's Momentos (1982) is believed to be the best-selling Latin album. Luis Miguel is the artist with the most entries on the certified list with fourteen albums, while Colombian pop singer Shakira has the most entries by a female artist with four. 
 
Groupings are based on different sales benchmarks, the highest being for claims of at least 10 million copies, and the lowest being for claims of 2–5 million copies. Albums are listed in order of number of copies sold and thereafter by the artist's first name. Markets' order within the table is based on the number of compact discs sold in each market, largest market at the top and smallest at the bottom.

Legend

By certifications and claimed sales
The albums on this list are based on claimed sales and certification copies provided by certifying authorities with an online database. The only exception is PROMUSICAE, where certifications prior to 2003 are listed on the book Sólo éxitos. Año a año. 1959-2002 (2005) by Fernando Salaverri.

10 million copies or more 
*All sales figures are shown in millions

5–9 million copies 
*All sales figures are shown in millions

2–4 million copies 
*All sales figures are shown in millions

By claimed sales only

The albums on this list are solely based on claimed sales and are not listed on any certification database online or does not enough have certified copies and currently only includes album in Spanish and Portuguese. This is mainly due to the lack of online databases for many Latin American countries. Currently, only Brazil and Mexico have an online database, while Argentina and Uruguay also had them for a while before they were taken down. Even so, the online database for the countries mentioned are not complete and only includes albums that have been certified after the databases went online. Thus, any album that was previously certified by the country's certifying authority are not retroactively included. For example, Falta Amor by Maná and Entrega Total by OV7 were certified platinum and gold by AMPROFON for sales of 250,000 and 100,000 copies in 1992 and 1998, respectively. However, neither albums are listed on AMPROFON's online database because its archives only date back to 1999. As a result, the figures shown are commonly cited by reputable sources, but its actual sales may be overexaggerated by the artists record label.

At least 2 million copies sold

See also 
 Album era
 List of best-selling albums by country
 List of best-selling music artists
 List of best-selling remix albums
 List of best-selling singles
 Lists of albums
 List of best-selling albums of the 21st century
 List of best-selling Latin albums in the United States

Notes

References 

Latin albums
Latin music albums